The 2021 Varsity Sport, the 10 season of a South African university.

This tournaments, football and netball, will take place in a secure Covid-19 bio-bubble called the Varsity Sport Village, matches will be played at University of Pretoria and Stellenbosch University.

Netball

Football

Men

Semi-finals

Finals

Women

Group A

Group B

Finals

See also 
Varsity Sports (South Africa)

References

Varsity Sports (South Africa)